Sobiepanka is a short river of Poland, a connection between the lakes Lampasz, Kujno and Dłużec.

Rivers of Poland
Rivers of Warmian-Masurian Voivodeship